Lakshmana Sena (reign: 1178–1206), also called Lakshman Sen in modern Indian languages, was the ruler from the Sena dynasty of the Bengal region on the Indian subcontinent. His rule lasted for 28 years; and extended to much of the eastern regions of the Indian subcontinent, notably Bengal, Bihar, and Jharkhand  regions. He is frequently known for his bravery in repelling all the invasions made by Bakhtiyar Khilji.

Reign 
Lakshmana Sena succeeded his father Ballala Sena. The history of his reign can be reconstructed from the epigraphs of his time that include the Deopara Prashasti stone inscriptions and copper plates from his successors. Tabaqt-i-Nasiri, composed by 1260, is another source of information about his reign.

In his youth, Lakshmana Sena led military campaigns against Gauḍa, Kamarupa, Kalinga and Varanasi (under the rule of Gahadavala King Jayachandra), and helped his grandfather Vijaya Sena and father Ballala Sena to expand the borders of the Sena kingdom. However, he ascended to the throne of Bengal himself at an advanced age.

Lakshmana Sena was interested in literature and composed a number of Sanskrit poems. He completed Adbhuta Sagara, a book incompletely written by his father. He assembled some of the major figures in contemporary Sanskrit literature-- Jayadeva, Dhoyin and Sharan—as his court poets. Among his other courtiers, Sridharadasa, Halayudh Mishra and Umapati Dhar also produced important treatises and works of literature. Lakshman Sena established a calendar era called Lakshmana Era that was used in Bengal and Bihar for at least 400 years. He also founded the prominent medieval city of Lakhnauti.

He was a devoted Vaishnav and took up titles like Paramavaisnava or Paramanarasingha to reflect that.

After subjugating Bihar in 1200, Turkish invader Bakhtiyar Khaliji's forces entered Nabadwip in Bengal. Bakhtiyar defeated Lakshmana Sena in 1203, marking the start of Muslim rule in Bengal. Subsequently, Bakhtiyar went on to capture the capital and the principal city, Lakhnauti, and conquered most of Bengal. Lakshmana Sena peacefully retreated to Bikrampur in east Bengal and continued his reign over the territory under Sena control till his death in 1206.

See also
 List of rulers of Bengal

References

Rulers of Bengal
1206 deaths
Sena dynasty